The Bradford-Keighley Youth Parliament (BKYP) is a youth organisation of democratically elected young people aged 11–21.

Formed in the early 2000s, the parliament now consists of 30 members, who are elected to represent the views of young people in their area to local government and service providers. Over 12,000 young people voted in the last election (March 2011), which are held in the five constituencies of Bradford (Shipley, Bradford West, Bradford South, Bradford East, and Keighley).

Composition

Membership
A Member of Youth Parliament (MYP) represents the views and needs of all young people in their constituency to government, service providers and decision makers locally, regionally and nationally. There are currently 30 Members of BKYP (MYPs).

Three MYPs from the BKYP are also selected to sit on the United Kingdom Youth Parliament.

Elections
The BKYP elections every two years, with all young people between the ages of 11-18 being entitled to vote.  Young people elect their local area's Member(s) of Youth Parliament (MYPs), who provide a voice for the young people in their area. Each constituency has 6 MYPS, with a total of 30 across the Bradford district.

At the last election in March 2011 over 12,000 votes were cast, with young people being able to vote in polling stations in school and youth clubs, or online.

Meetings
The BKYP meets regularly (normally weekly) both with their other constituency MYPS, and the youth parliament as a whole. At these meetings MYPs discuss issues and prepare future campaigns.

As well as this, there are also several meetings each year in Bradford City Hall. Young people are encouraged to come to these meetings to question their MYPs and find out about their work.

See also 
 UK Youth Parliament

References

External links 
 BKYP.com

Political organisations based in England
Organisations based in Bradford